Ptecticus sackenii is a species of soldier fly in the family Stratiomyidae.

References

Further reading

External links

 

Stratiomyidae
Insects described in 1885